"Home" (stylized in all caps) is a song by South Korean boy band BTS. It was released digitally on April 12, 2019, as part of the extended play Map of the Soul: Persona.

Background and release 
The song was released digitally on April 12, 2019.

Composition and lyrics 
"Home" is a pop and R&B track with lyrics that talk about how although they have become successful and are now able to afford the things that they wanted before success, they find themselves unsatisfied with the luxuries. In the song, Jimin sings, "“The more I fill up the emptier I get / The more I’m with people the more I feel alone.” By the end of the song, they come into the presence of their lover and find comfort at last. The song links to their prior song "Magic Shop" from Love Yourself: Tear, mirroring lines such as “you got me / I got you” and “so show me / I’ll show you”.

During a press conference, J-Hope expanded on the meaning of the song, saying, "The song talks about the ‘home’, which is where the fans are and where our hearts are, where we want to come back to when things are hard and we feel lonely. We get strength from the people who love us and wait for us.”

Reception 
Joshua Minsoo Kim from Pitchfork called the song a "standout track [that] projects an image of carefree luxury," and Noah Yoo from the same agency called the song the album's highlight, with dynamic flows and the interplay between the members effortless. Neil Z. Yeung from AllMusic called it smooth and soulful, and Kelly Wynne from Newsweek called it well-rounded and an "interesting mix between rap and slow pop."

Personnel 
Personnel adapted from the CD liner notes of Map of the Soul: Persona.

 BTS – primary vocals
Pdogg – songwriting, producing, keyboard, synthesizer, vocal arrangement, rap arrangement, recording engineer
RM – songwriting, rap arrangement, recording engineer
Lauren Dyson – songwriting
Tushar Apte – songwriting
Suga – songwriting
J-Hope – songwriting

Krysta Youngs – songwriting
Julia Ross – songwriting
Jeong Bobby – songwriting
Song Jae-kyeong – songwriting
Adora – songwriting, chorus, recording engineer, digital editing
Jungkook – chorus
Hiss Noise – recording engineer
Jeong Woo-yeong – digital editing

Charts

References 

2019 songs
BTS songs
Songs written by Adora (singer)
Songs written by RM (rapper)
Songs written by Pdogg
Songs written by Lauren Dyson
Songs written by J-Hope
Songs written by Tushar Apte
Songs written by Suga (rapper)